City Theatre is a professional theater company located in Pittsburgh's South Side.  It specializes in productions of new plays and has commissioned new works by playwrights on the national theatre scene, including Christopher Durang, Adam Rapp, and Jeffrey Hatcher.  Established in 1975 as the City Players under the direction of Marjorie Walker, it was originally composed mainly of Carnegie Mellon graduates and was part of Pittsburgh's Department of Parks and Recreation, performing at schools, parks, and housing projects.  Initially the group shared their performance space in the North Side's Allegheny Center with Pittsburgh Public Theater.  In 1979, the group was offered a residency at the University of Pittsburgh and renamed itself City Theatre. “Homeless” for a brief period of time, the University of Pittsburgh theatre department offered to shelter the theater company in 1980. Attilo Favorini, head of the department, thought that, “The City Theater offered us [Pitt] the opportunity for Pitt’s students to work a professional company.”(Steele, Bruce “Artistic Struggles -The City Theater Company: A History of Bad Luck and Good Theater” pg. 27) In addition to receiving a new troupe of professional actors, arts funding through CETA enabled the expansion of the company and the creation of the Three Rivers Shakespeare Festival in the summer of 1980.  In 1981, under the artistic direction of Marc Masterson, the company moved to a new performance space on Bouquet Street in Oakland.  The company again moved to a new performance space at the former Bingham United Methodist Church in the South Side in 1991, where in addition to its own season it acted as a host space for the earliest productions of the Pittsburgh New Works Festival.  Marc Masterson became artistic director of Actors Theatre of Louisville in Kentucky, and Tracy Brigden became artistic director in 2001.

In addition to its mainstage season, City Theatre offers educational outreach programs such as the Young Playwrights Festival, in which selected submitted plays by students in middle school and high school are given professional productions, and City Theatre Playmakers, which provides opportunities for Pittsburgh youth to write radio dramas that are fully produced and broadcast.

See also
Theatre in Pittsburgh

References
City Theatre Company Records (City Theatre Company Records, 1973-1993, CTC.1991.01, Curtis Theatre Collection, Special Collections Department, University of Pittsburgh)

Theatres in Pittsburgh
Theatre companies in Pittsburgh
Religious buildings and structures completed in 1859
Pittsburgh History & Landmarks Foundation Historic Landmarks